Only Way Is Up is the debut studio album by American rapper K Camp. It was released on September 4, 2015, by Interscope Records. The album was preceded by the singles: "Lil Bit", "Comfortable" and "1Hunnid".

Singles 
The album's lead single, "Lil Bit" was released on January 27, 2015.

The album's second single, "Comfortable" was released on June 9, 2015.

Commercial performance
The album debuted at number 20 on the Billboard 200 with 18,000 equivalent album units, selling 11,000 copies in its first week of availability in the United States.

Track listing
All writing credits found from YouTube

 (*) indicates additional producer

Charts

Weekly charts

Year-end charts

References 

2015 debut albums
K Camp albums
Albums produced by Honorable C.N.O.T.E.
Interscope Records albums